Roj may refer to:

Rój, a district in Poland
Roj TV, a Kurdish  satellite television station
Roj Blake, the eponymous rebel leader from the BBC television series Blake's 7
Andrzej Gąsienica Roj (1930-1989), Polish skier who competed in the 1952 Olympic Games - see Poland at the 1952 Winter Olympics 
Rok Roj (born 1986), Slovenian footballer
Rings of Jupiter

See also
 Rojs